Scartella poiti is a species of combtooth blenny found in coral reefs in the southwest Atlantic ocean, around Trindade Island, Brazil.  This species reaches a length of  SL. The specific name honours the Brazilian Navy's  Posto Oceanográfico da Ilha da Trindade ("Oceanographic Post of Trindade Island”), in gratitude for their assistance to the authors on their trips to the island.

References

poiti
Fish described in 2004